Benjamin Hill (born 5 February 1990) is an Australian cyclist, who last rode for UCI Continental team .

Career
Hill was suspended for 2 years from cycling by the Australian Sports Anti-Doping Authority for testing positive for Methylhexanamine  during the 2012 Tour of Tasmania. Hill admitted the error immediately after a teammate gave him the substance instead of caffeine. Hill tried to fight his suspension stating it was unfair he was given 2 years when people who purposely blood doped got 6 months.
In the 2016 cycling season Hill was supposed to ride for Dynamo Cover, a new UCI Continental team which folded before it even started racing. This left Hill among others looking for a new team for 2016. At the National race, Cootamundra Annual Classic, Hill finished in first place, his partner Rebecca Wiasak also won her event. In 2017 at the Tour of Hainan Hill crashed during stage 8 and fractured 7 vertebrae ending his season early. At the 2020 Herald Sun Tour Hill spent every stage in the breakaway earning himself enough points to win the green sprinters jersey.

Since 2020 Hill has been working as a cycling coach at Today's Plan.

Major results

2016
 1st  Overall Tour of Thailand
 1st  Sprints classification Herald Sun Tour
 6th Tour of Yancheng Coastal Wetlands
2017
 1st Overall Tour de Tochigi
1st Points classification
1st Mountains classification
 1st  Mountains classification Herald Sun Tour
 7th Japan Cup Cycle Road Race
 8th National Criterium Championships
2019
 1st Stage 3 Tour of Japan
 1st Trofeo Alcide Degasperi 
2020
 1st  Sprints classification Herald Sun Tour
 5th UCI Esports World Championships
 8th Overall Tour de Taiwan
2022
 4th UCI Esports World Championships

References

External links

1990 births
Living people
Australian male cyclists
Cyclists from New South Wales
Cycling coaches